Panama competed at the 2022 World Aquatics Championships in Budapest, Hungary from 17 June to 3 July.

Swimming

Panama entered four swimmers.

Men

Women

References

Nations at the 2022 World Aquatics Championships
Panama at the World Aquatics Championships
World Aquatics Championships